Tonnis is both a given name and a surname. Notable people with the name include:

Tonnis van der Heeg (1886–1958), Dutch trade unionist, politician, and resistance activist
Christiaan Tonnis (born 1956), German painter, draftsman, video artist and author

See also

Tennis (disambiguation)
Tonis
Tonnes (name)
Tonnie
Tonni (name)